Bulteel is a surname, and may refer to:

Andrew Bulteel (1850–1888), English rugby union international
Émile Bulteel (1906–1978), French water polo player
John Crocker Bulteel (1793–1843), English politician
John Bulteel (died 1669) (?–1669), English member of Parliament, friend of Pepys
John Bulteel (writer) (1627–1692), English writer and translator, cousin of the above